Parrot Pie may refer to:
Parrot Pie, a 1973 one-act opera for children by Peter Tahourdin
Parrot Pie, a 1927 book of parodies by William Kean Seymour
Parrot Pie for Breakfast : an Anthology of Women Pioneers, a 1999 book by Jane Robinson